Helmut Barbe (28 December 1927 in Halle - 18 April 2021) was a German composer.

Between 1952 and 1975 he was the Cantor at the church  in Berlin's Spandau quarter. After this he took a post as a professor at the Berlin University of the Arts in what was at that time West Berlin.

In 1956 Barbe premiered his musical "Hallelujah Billy" at the German Evangelical Church Assembly in Frankfurt am Main.   This led commentators to identify him as a pioneer of contemporary worship music, in German Neues Geistliches Lied (NGL, literally: new spiritual song).

References

20th-century classical composers
German classical composers
Sacred music composers
Academic staff of the Berlin University of the Arts
1927 births
2021 deaths
People from Halle (Saale)
German male classical composers
20th-century German composers
20th-century German male musicians